Simon Shnapir (born August 20, 1987) is an American former competitive pair skater. With Marissa Castelli, he is the 2013 Four Continents bronze medalist, the 2009 World Junior bronze medalist, and a two-time U.S. national champion (2013 & 2014). The pair won a bronze medal in the team event at the 2014 Winter Olympics. After their split in May 2014, Shnapir teamed up with DeeDee Leng and competed in the 2014–15 season.

Personal life
Shnapir was born to Jewish parents, both chemical engineering graduates, in Moscow, Russian SFSR, Soviet Union. He arrived in the United States with his family when he was 16 months old. After living in Brighton, Boston for a few years, the family moved to Sudbury, Massachusetts.

Shnapir graduated from Lincoln-Sudbury Regional High School in 2005, and went on to major in marketing at Emerson College.

Career
Shnapir began learning to skate in 1993. Early in his pairs career, he skated with Tanya Aziz and Courtney Gill. Bobby Martin became his coach in around 2000.

Partnership with Castelli 
Shnapir and Marissa Castelli teamed up in April 2006 and began training together in earnest in June. They trained in Boston, coached by Bobby Martin, Carrie Wall (technical), Mark Mitchell (in-betweens, polishing), and Peter Johansson (throws). Castelli broke Shnapir's nose once while they were practicing the twist.

Castelli/Shnapir qualified for the 2008 Junior Grand Prix Final and placed sixth. The pair won the bronze medal at the 2009 World Junior Championships.

In the 2009–10 season, Castelli was off the ice for a month after a collision with an Italian skater resulting in 15 stitches to her inner thigh. The pair placed tenth on the senior level at the 2010 U.S. Championships and were sent to the 2010 Four Continents Championships where they also finished tenth.

In 2012, Castelli/Shnapir split up for a month but decided to recommit to their partnership. They won gold at the 2012 Ice Challenge and then won bronze, their first Grand Prix medal, at the 2012 NHK Trophy. They won their first national title at the 2013 U.S. Championships. They were assigned to the 2013 Four Continents and won the bronze medal.

Castelli/Shnapir won their second national title at the 2014 U.S. Championships and were named in the U.S. team to the 2014 Winter Olympics, held in February in Sochi, Russia. They won a bronze medal in the team event and placed 9th in the pairs event. In March, Castelli/Shnapir finished 11th at the 2014 World Championships in Saitama, Japan. They announced the end of their partnership on May 7, 2014.

Partnership with Leng 
On May 28, 2014, the Associated Press reported that Shnapir had teamed up with DeeDee Leng. They were coached by Bobby Martin and Carrie Wall at the Skating Club of Boston. For the 2014-2015 Grand Prix season, they were assigned to Rostelecom Cup and NHK Trophy. After having placed 6th and 8th at these competitions, respectively, Leng and Shnapir placed 8th at the 2015 U.S. Championships.

In April 2015, Leng suffered a season-ending concussion during a practice session. On June 30, 2015, Shnapir announced his retirement from competitions. In November 2016, he became the director of the high performance program at the Skating Club of Boston.

Programs

With Leng

With Castelli

Competitive highlights
GP: Grand Prix; JGP: Junior Grand Prix

With Leng

With Castelli

See also
List of select Jewish figure skaters

References

External links

  at Figure Skaters Online

American male pair skaters
Figure skaters from Moscow
Living people
1987 births
Jewish American sportspeople
American people of Russian-Jewish descent
Russian emigrants to the United States
Russian Jews
World Junior Figure Skating Championships medalists
Figure skaters at the 2014 Winter Olympics
Medalists at the 2014 Winter Olympics
Olympic medalists in figure skating
Olympic bronze medalists for the United States in figure skating
Lincoln-Sudbury Regional High School alumni
Four Continents Figure Skating Championships medalists
21st-century American Jews